Ágnes Kovács (born 13 July 1981) is a Hungarian swimmer who competed at the 1996, 2000 and 2004 Olympics. In 2000, she won the 200 m breaststroke and set the Hungary records in the 100 m and 200 m breaststrokes events (1:07.79 and 2:24.03). As of 2014, these records still stand. She won a bronze medal in the 200 m breaststroke at the 1996 Olympics and placed fifth in 2004; in 2004 she also finished fourth in the 200 m individual medley event.

Kovács learned to swim aged two and a half years and started to train seriously at nine. Aged fourteen, she became a European Junior champion in the 100 yard breaststroke, and next year won an Olympic medal. From 1995 through 2007 she won 17 medals at European championships and 53 Hungarian titles. She was named Hungarian Sportswoman of the Year in four consecutive years, from 1997 to 2000. In 2014, she was inducted into the International Swimming Hall of Fame.

Kovács lives with her husband and son in Hungary. She is a PhD student at the Faculty of Physical Education and Sports Sciences of Semmelweis University.

Awards
 Masterly youth athlete: 1995, 1996
  Cross of Merit of the Republic of Hungary – Silver Cross (1996)
 Best Hungarian Junior Athlete of the Year (Telesport) (1): 1996
 Hungarian swimmer of the Year (7): 1997, 1998, 1999, 2000, 2001, 2004, 2006
 Hungarian Sportswoman of the Year (4) – votes of sports journalists: 1997, 1998, 1999, 2000
 Swimming World Magazine – European Swimmer of the Year (2): 1997, 1998
  Order of Merit of the Republic of Hungary – Officer's Cross (2000)
 Honorary Citizen of Kőbánya (2001)
 Presidential recognition (2004)
 Budapest Pro Urbe award (2006)
 Member of International Swimming Hall of Fame (2014)
 Honorary Citizen of Budapest (2014)
 Arizona State University Hall of Fame (2015)

References 

1981 births
Living people
Arizona State Sun Devils women's swimmers
European Aquatics Championships medalists in swimming
Hungarian female breaststroke swimmers
Olympic bronze medalists for Hungary
Olympic gold medalists for Hungary
Olympic bronze medalists in swimming
Olympic swimmers of Hungary
Swimmers at the 1996 Summer Olympics
Swimmers at the 2000 Summer Olympics
Swimmers at the 2004 Summer Olympics
World Aquatics Championships medalists in swimming
Medalists at the 2000 Summer Olympics
Medalists at the 1996 Summer Olympics
Olympic gold medalists in swimming
Swimmers from Budapest